Marvin Felix Camillo (1937 in Newark, New Jersey – January 22, 1988 in La Rochelle, France) was an American theater director and actor, noted for his founding of The Family theater company, a group in New York largely made up of ex-convicts.

Stage productions
 Short Eyes (1974)
 The Cool World (1960)

References

External links
 
 

1937 births
1988 deaths
American male stage actors
American theatre directors
Drama Desk Award winners
Road incident deaths in France
Male actors from Newark, New Jersey
20th-century American male actors